30 Years to Life is a 2001 American comedy film, written and directed by Vanessa Middleton. The film, which marks Middleton's directorial debut, stars Allen Payne, Paula Jai Parker, and Tracy Morgan. The film premiered at the 2001 Sundance Film Festival. The film released to theatres on June 7, 2002 in the United States.

Plot
A handful of close friends, due to turn 30, discover that their dreams for the future are running headfirst into the realities of adulthood in this character-driven comedy-drama. Natalie is a banker who is happy with her job, but is tired of being single, and her pursuit of a husband is taking her down several blind alleys in the world of dating. Joy has developed a similar desire to settle down and get married, but while she has a long-term boyfriend, Leland, he is not so sure he wants to make a lifetime commitment. Troy is a comic who has been on the verge of a career breakthrough for years, but he is starting to wonder if his big break is ever going to arrive. Malik is a white-collar executive who thinks life is passing him by, and is pondering giving up a stable career to start over as a model. And Stephanie is comfortable with her job in real estate, but she is not so comfortable with herself as she struggles with a weight problem she's had since childhood.

Cast
 Allen Payne as Malik
 Erika Alexander as Joy
 Kadeem Hardison as Bruce
 Melissa De Sousa as Natalie
 Paula Jai Parker as Stephanie
 T.E. Russell as Leland
 Tracy Morgan as Troy
 Donald Koanegay as Damon
 Eddie Brill as Lenny
 Grace Garland as Dr. Love
 Laz Alonso as Richard

Reception
On Rotten Tomatoes, the film has a 67% approval rating from critics based on nine reviews, with an average rating of 5.61/10.

Accolades

2003 Black Reel Awards
Best Independent Actor (Theatrical) — Erika Alexander (winner)
Best Independent Actress (Theatrical) — Melissa De Sousa (nominated)

2001 Sundance Film Festival
Grand Jury Prize — Dramatic (nominated)

References

External links

 
 

2001 films
African-American comedy films
2001 comedy films
2000s English-language films
2001 directorial debut films
2000s American films